Koral Hazan (born 17 January 1999) is an Israeli footballer who plays as a forward for Croatian club ŽNK Split and the Israel women's national team.

Club career
Hazan is a Bnot Caesarea FC product. She has played for Maccabi Kishronot Hadera FC, Youth Academy, Hapoel Ra'anana FC, FC Ramat HaSharon and Maccabi Emek Hefer in Israel.

International career
Hazan has been capped for the Israel national team, appearing for the team during the 2023 FIFA Women's World Cup qualifying cycle.

International goals

References

External links
 Koral Hazan – UEFA competition record
 
 

1999 births
Living people
Israeli women's footballers
Women's association football forwards
Maccabi Kishronot Hadera F.C. players
F.C. Ramat HaSharon players
ŽNK Split players
Israel women's international footballers
Israeli expatriate women's footballers
Israeli expatriate sportspeople in Croatia
Expatriate women's footballers in Croatia
Jewish Israeli sportspeople